Franklin County is a county on the northern border of the U.S. state of New York. To the north across the Canada–United States border are the Canadian provinces of Quebec and Ontario, from east to west. As of the 2020 census, the county population was 47,555. Its county seat is Malone. The county is named in honor of United States Founding Father Benjamin Franklin.

Franklin County comprises the Malone, NY Micropolitan Statistical Area. Much of Franklin County is within Adirondack Park. Within the border of the county is the St. Regis Mohawk Reservation, or Akwesasne in the Mohawk language. Its population was nearly 3,300 in the 2010 census. The people are linked by community and history with the Mohawk of the Akwesasne reserve across the river, spanning the border of Quebec and Ontario. The Mohawk have had authority under the Jay Treaty to freely cross this international border.

History
This area was long occupied by Iroquoian-speaking peoples. In historic times, a group of primarily Mohawks established a village south of colonial Montreal across the St. Lawrence River; they had been trading with French colonists and many had converted to Catholicism. They were the easternmost nation of the Iroquois League of Five Nations, known in their language as the Haudenosaunee.

After the English conquered the Dutch in the New York area, they established counties in 1683, in the eastern part of New York province and what is now Vermont. Both groups had settled primarily in Albany and along the Hudson River, a major waterway linking the upriver fur trade with the market of Manhattan. The first counties were very large in geographic area, taking in low-density populations. Gradually new counties were formed as colonial settlement increased, but most settlers stayed east of the middle of the Mohawk Valley, as the Iroquois nations controlled the lands beyond that. Historically the French, Dutch and English all traded with the Mohawk, the easternmost of these nations.

The area of the present Franklin County was part of Albany County when it was established in 1683.  This was an enormous county, including the northern part of what became New York State as well as all of the present state of Vermont and, in theory, extending westward to the Pacific Ocean. This county was reduced in size on July 3, 1766, by the creation of Cumberland County, and further on March 16, 1770, by the creation of Gloucester County, both containing territory now in Vermont.  On March 12, 1772, what was left of Albany County was split into three parts, one remaining under the name Albany County. Charlotte County contained the eastern portion.

In 1784, the name "Charlotte County" was changed to Washington County to honor George Washington, the American Revolutionary War general and later President of the United States of America.

In 1788, Clinton County was split off from Washington County. It comprised a much larger area than the present Clinton County, including several other counties or county parts of the present New York State.

Following the American Revolutionary War, the United States forced the Six Nations of the Haudenosaunee, or Iroquois Confederacy, to cede most of their lands in New York and Pennsylvania, as most had been allies of Great Britain, which had lost to the new United States. After the war, New York State sold off 5 million acres of former Iroquois territory at very low prices, seeking to attract settlers to develop farms and businesses. Land speculators quickly took advantage of the sales. Franklin County was part of the huge speculative Macomb's Purchase of 1791.

In 1799, Clinton County was reduced in size by the splitting off of Essex County. In 1802, Clinton County was reduced in size by a part of Clinton and two other counties being taken to form the new St. Lawrence County.

Franklin County organized
In 1808, Franklin County was split off from Clinton County and organized. It was named after United States Founding Father Benjamin Franklin. In the early decades many landowners basically were subsistence farmers.

In the late 1880s and 1890s, both the Delaware and Hudson and New York Central railroads were constructed into the Town of Franklin. The Chateaugay branch of the Delaware and Hudson served the hamlet of Onchiota, which developed for the lumber industry. For more than 12 years, a major tract north of Saranac Lake was harvested and millions of feet of timber were shipped out from here.

The railroads carried the timber and products to market, and the industry flourished into the early 20th century until much of the timber was harvested. Several lumber mills operated in this area for decades, including Kinsley Lumber Company, Baker Brothers Lumber Company, and one owned by the Dock and Coal Company. The latter mill was dismantled in 1917 and shipped to Florida to be used in the lumber industry there. The population declined as the lumber industry pulled out of the area.

The railroads contributed to the Town of Franklin becoming a destination for summer travelers. In the late 1800s, Franklin County was home to three of the largest resort hotels in the Adirondacks: Paul Smith's Hotel, Loon Lake House, and the Rainbow Inn. Due to the construction of highways and restructuring in the railroad industry, passenger service was ended to this remote area in the mid-20th century.

The history of Franklin County is preserved at the Franklin Historical and Museum Society in Malone, New York.

Ray Fadden (Mohawk), with his wife, Christine, and son, John, was the founder and curator of the Six Nations Indian Museum located in Onchiota, a census-designated place in the Town of Franklin. He built the structure from logs he had milled himself. The family-owned museum features more than 3,000 artifacts primarily from the Iroquoian nations, and interprets their culture. They were a prominent confederacy in New York of Six Nations by 1722, and they controlled much of the state west of colonial settlements in Albany and Schenectady.

Geography

It is the fourth-largest county in New York by land area. Franklin County is in the northeastern part of New York State. The northern edge borders Quebec and Ontario provinces of Canada.

The Upper, Middle and Lower Saranac lakes are located within the county. These are part of the natural resource attractions in the area. Lower Saranac Lake extends into neighboring Essex County to the southeast. Loon Lake is also located in the county, as is its namesake community.

Adjacent counties and municipality
 Clinton County - east
 Essex County - southeast
 Hamilton County - southwest
 St. Lawrence County - west
 Stormont, Dundas and Glengarry United Counties, Ontario, Canada - northwest
 Le Haut-Saint-Laurent Regional County Municipality, Quebec, Canada - north

Demographics

2020 Census

2000 census
As of the census of 2000, there were 51,134 people, 17,931 households, and 11,798 families residing in the county. The racial makeup of the county was 84.03% White, 6.63% Black or African American, 6.20% Native American, 0.38% Asian, 2.07% from other races, and 0.69% from two or more races.  4.01% of the population were Hispanic or Latino of any race. 31.0% were of French, 13.6% Irish, 10.6% American, 9.8% French Canadian, 9.2% English and 5.4% German ancestry according to Census 2000. 94.6% spoke English, 2.3% Spanish and 2.0% French] as their first language.

There were 17,931 households, out of which 32.20% had children under the age of 18 living with them, 49.50% were married couples living together, 11.10% had a female householder with no husband present, and 34.20% were non-families. 28.20% of all households were made up of individuals, and 12.00% had someone living alone who was 65 years of age or older.  The average household size was 2.46 and the average family size was 3.00.

In the county, the population was spread out, with 22.80% under the age of 18, 9.50% from 18 to 24, 33.20% from 25 to 44, 21.80% from 45 to 64, and 12.80% who were 65 years of age or older.  The median age was 36 years. For every 100 females there were 121.70 males.  For every 100 females age 18 and over, there were 126.60 males.

The median income for a household in the county was $31,517, and the median income for a family was $38,472. Males had a median income of $29,376 versus $22,292 for females. The per capita income for the county was $15,888.  About 10.10% of families and 14.60% of the population were below the poverty line, including 17.60% of those under age 18 and 13.90% of those age 65 or over.

Education 
Franklin County is home to North Country Community College and Paul Smith's College.  North Country Community College is sponsored by and  serves Franklin and Essex counties, with campuses in Saranac Lake (village) - Malone (town) and Ticonderoga.

Transportation

The area has no public transportation but roads extend through the county. Scheduled train service by the New York Central from Lake Clear to Malone ended in 1956. 

On April 24, 1965, the New York Central ran its final passenger train on the Adirondack Division from Lake Placid, through Lake Clear to Utica.

Airports 
The following public use airports are located in the county:
 Adirondack Regional Airport (SLK) – Saranac Lake
 Malone-Dufort Airport (MAL) – Malone

Communities

Larger Settlements

† - County Seat

‡ - Not Wholly in this County

Towns

 Bangor
 Bellmont
 Bombay
 Brandon
 Brighton
 Burke
 Chateaugay
 Constable
 Dickinson
 Duane
 Fort Covington
 Franklin
 Harrietstown
 Malone
 Moira
 Santa Clara
 Tupper Lake
 Waverly
 Westville

Hamlets

 Gabriels
 Goldsmith
 Hogansburg
 Keese Mill
 Lake Clear
 Owls Head
 Reynoldston
 Saint Regis
 Skerry
 Upper St. Regis
 Vermontville

Native reservations 
 St. Regis Mohawk Reservation is international, extending across the border into Quebec, Canada. Also known as the Akwesasne reserve, the community was founded in the mid-1700s, when all the territory was part of New France. Citizens of Akwesasne have rights for free passage across the border.

Notable person
 Fernando C. Beaman, US Congressman

Politics

|}

Franklin County typically voted Republican for presidential candidates, until the election of Bill Clinton in 1992. Clinton carried the county by a five-point margin in 1992, and increased his lead in 1996 with a more than 20-point victory. The county remained reliably Democratic for twenty years, giving Barack Obama  margins of 22.2% in 2008 and 26.1% in 2012. In 2016, Donald Trump became the first Republican since 1988 to carry Franklin County; he carried it again in 2020, albeit by a  margin of 2.2%. Nevertheless, this constituted Trump's largest percentage margin amongst the five counties in the state which he won by fewer than 500 raw votes (in Franklin County's case, by 415). Obama's 62.09% of Franklin County's vote is the highest percentage of the vote that he received in a county that would flip to Donald Trump four years later, and Franklin County shifted rightwards more than any other New York county in 2016.

See also

 North Country Community College
 Cure Cottages of Saranac Lake
 Adirondack Canoe Classic
 Hinchinbrooke River
 List of counties in New York
 National Register of Historic Places listings in Franklin County
 Church Street Historic District
 Adirondack County, New York - a proposed new county

References

Further reading

External links
 
  Franklin County webpage
   Franklin County Historical and Museum Society
 About: Six Nations Indian Museum
 
  Franklin County history pages , posted at Ray's Place
  Franklin County historical information, New York Roots
  History of a Mill Town
 Oral History of Franklin County, Franklin County, NY in the late 19th and early 20th centuries

 
New York (state) counties
1808 establishments in New York (state)
Populated places established in 1808